The Administrative Code of the City of New York contains the codified local laws of New York City as enacted by the New York City Council and Mayor. , it contains 37 titles, numbered 1 through 16, 16-A, 16-B, 17 through 20, 20-A, 21, 21-A, and 22 through 33.

The Constitution of New York enumerates the powers of local governments, such as the power to elect a legislative body and adopt local laws. A local law has a status equivalent with a law enacted by the Legislature (subject to certain exceptions and restrictions), and is superior to the older forms of municipal legislation such as ordinances, resolutions, rules and regulations.

See also 
 Rules of the City of New York
 New York City Legislative Annual
 New York City Report
 New York City Charter
 Local Laws of the Cities in the State of New York
 Local Laws of New York City
 The City Record
 Government of New York City
 Consolidated Laws of New York
 Laws of New York
 Law of New York

References

External links 
 New York City Administrative Code from American Legal Publishing

New York (state) law
Government of New York City
New York City law